Let's Talk Music was a Canadian classical music television series which aired on CBC Television from 1962 to 1967.

Premise
Series hosts William Stevens, a pianist, and Norman Kihl, an announcer for the network, hosted this Montreal-produced series on classical music geared towards viewers who were unfamiliar with the genre. Stevens explained classical music concepts with performances of pieces by Stevens and guests which included Dorothy Weldon (harp), Robert Peters (tenor), Louis Charbonneau (tympani).

Scheduling
The half-hour series was broadcast on the national network on Sundays at 12:30 p.m. from 6 May to 24 June 1962. It returned on a regional basis in Ontario and Quebec from 1965 to 1967, airing from July until September or October at various time slots in those years.

References

External links
 

CBC Television original programming
1962 Canadian television series debuts
1967 Canadian television series endings